Green Mansion or Green Mansion House may refer to:

Places
Green Mansion (Newark, Delaware), NRHP-listed
Green Mansion House (Kenton, Delaware), listed on the NRHP in Kent County, Delaware
Green Mansion (İzmir) a historical building in İzmir.

Other
Green Mansion (film), a 2008 Hong Kong film

See also
Green Mansions: A Romance of the Tropical Forest, a romance book
Green Mansions (film), film with Audrey Hepburn